Bless This Mess is the second studio album by Bamboo Mañalac. Its lead single is "Firepower".

"Firepower" debuted at number one on MYX charts. The second release, "Nothing Like You", peaked at number 9 on Pinoy MYX Countdown and number 13 on MYX Hit Chart. "C@ll", the album's third release, premiered on New Year's Day 2017 on MYX. It peaked at number 2 on MYX Daily Top 10: Pinoy Edition (as of January 6, 2017) and number 3 on Pinoy MYX Countdown (as of January 7, 2017).

Track listing

Personnel
 Bamboo Mañalac - vocals
 Ria Osorio - piano, keyboard, orchestrator
 Kakoy Legaspi - guitars
 Junjun Regalado - drums
 Simon Tan - bass guitar
 Bong Gonzales - guitars

Album Credits
All Songs are written by Bamboo except track 4 & 10 written by Kakoy Legaspi
Recorded at Grand Street Recording Studios
Tracked and Mixed by: Jake Lummus
Mastered by: Fred Kevorkian
Album Packaging: Will Monzon

References

2015 albums
Bamboo Mañalac albums
PolyEast Records albums